John F. Clark is an American law enforcement official and non-profit executive who served as the director of the United States Marshals Service, appointed to the position by president George W. Bush on March 17, 2006 and succeeded by Stacia Hylton in 2010. On January 3, 2010, Clark joined Lockheed Martin as director of security operations for information systems and global solutions.

Education 
Clark earned a Bachelor of Science degree from Syracuse University.

Career 
Clark began his career with the United States Marshals Service in the San Francisco and San Jose offices of the United States District Court for the Northern District of California. He has held several other senior positions, including chief deputy U.S. marshal for the Eastern District of Virginia, chief inspector of the Internal Affairs Division, and chief inspector of the International Fugitive Investigations Division. He also served for seven years in the Special Operations Group. Before his employment with the U.S. Marshals, he was employed by the United States Capitol Police and the United States Border Patrol.

On January 3, 2010, Clark joined Lockheed Martin as their director of security operations for information systems and global solutions.

Clark was the CEO of the National Center for Missing & Exploited Children.

References

External links
Official US Marshals biography

United States Border Patrol agents
United States Marshals
United States Capitol Police officers
Living people
Year of birth missing (living people)
Syracuse University alumni
Lockheed Martin people